The Slovene Wikipedia is the Slovene-language edition of the free online encyclopedia Wikipedia. It has been active since 26 February 2002. On 15 August 2010, it reached 100,000 articles.

Wikipedia is a widely used reference work and one of the most visited social networking services by users from Slovenia, but official internet usage statistics do not distinguish between Wikipedia editions, analyzing only the base domain wikipedia.org. In most cases, the Slovene-language edition gets a passing note of its existence in media reports about Wikipedia in general. However, as a relatively large and freely accessible body of structured knowledge, Slovene Wikipedia has been used, as an example, for building text corpora for the purpose of training linguistic software and analyzing Slovene literary authors' web presence. There are several successful collaboration projects with professors at the University of Ljubljana, using content creation by students as a teaching method.

Active Wikipedians from Slovenia have also been featured in discussions about Wikipedia (both general and Slovene-language specific) in national media.

Milestones 
 100 articles - June 18, 2002
 1,000 articles - September 30, 2003
 10,000 articles - February 7, 2005
 20,000 articles - December 17, 2005
 30,000 articles - June 30, 2006
 40,000 articles - February 15, 2007
 50,000 articles - July 17, 2007
 100,000 articles - August 15, 2010
 150,000 articles - March 31, 2016

References

External links 

 Slovene Wikipedia
 Vse najboljše, Wikipedija! . [Happy Birthday, Wikipedia!]. Radio interview on Val 202 on the occasion of the 10th anniversary of the Slovene Wikipedia. RTV Slovenija. Accessed on 25 February 2012.

Wikipedias by language
Internet properties established in 2002
Slovene-language mass media
Volunteering in Slovenia
Slovenian encyclopedias